Krčevine is the name of the several villages in Bosnia-Herzegovina:

 Krčevine (Busovača), municipality of Busovača 
 Krčevine (Ilijaš), municipality of Ilijaš
 Krčevine (Kiseljak), municipality of Kiseljak
 Krčevine (Šipovo), municipality of Šipovo
 Krčevine, Vareš, municipality of Vareš
 Krčevine, Vitez, municipality of Vitez